Bitzi was a website, operating from 2001 to 2013, where volunteers shared reports about any kind of digital file, with identifying metadata, commentary, and other ratings.

Information contributed and rated by volunteers was compiled into the Bitpedia data set and reference work, described by Bitzi as a "digital media encyclopedia". The Bitpedia was published through the Bitzi website and web services under an open content license (Creative Commons Attribution - Share Alike 2.0).

Bitzi's standards and services have been adopted by a number of popular peer-to-peer file sharing systems. Bitzi was sponsored by a metadata publishing company of the same name based in San Francisco.

History

Founded by Gordon Mohr with Mike Linksvayer the Bitzi service launched in 2001.

The Bitzi website shut down on 31 December 2013.

Technology

At Bitzi, files are identified by applying a strong hash function to their contents, which gives a distinct "fingerprint" for each file. Bitzi calls the combination of standard hash functions used by its system "bitprints." An open source downloadable tool, the Bitcollider, calculates file hashes and extracts intrinsic metadata from common media file types to assist user contributions.

Bitzi cross-references multiple Uniform Resource Identifiers (URIs) for files, primarily URIs used by peer-to-peer file-sharing networks and/or clients:

 sha1:/magnet: (Gnutella)
  (Grokster)
 tree:tiger: (DC++, Shareaza).
 ed2k: (eDonkey2000, eMule, OverNet)

Other file-specific metadata is also collected, such as file size, alternate filenames, audio/video encoding details, user ratings, and free-form comments or descriptions. Users can displace flawed information with new contributions.

Data about specific files can also be programmatically retrieved via a REST-style XML Web Services.

Relationship to peer-to-peer networks

Bitzi originated several popular standards in the peer-to-peer file sharing sphere, including the Magnet URI scheme and Tiger tree hashes.

Many peer-to-peer file sharing programs, including LimeWire/Frostwire, older Bearshare versions, and older Shareaza versions, offer an option to look up local files or network search results at Bitzi for more information about their contents or quality.

As peer-to-peer file sharing networks are often plagued by mislabeled or corrupt files, Bitzi can sometimes provide additional confidence that a file is as expected, before a user begins a long download. In such a role, Bitzi serves to ameliorate some common attacks on peer-to-peer networks.

References

External links
 The bitzi.com website
 List of applications using Bitzi
 Bitcollider project at SourceForge

Knowledge markets